Paul Wright is an American musician originally from Eugene, Oregon. His debut album, Fly Away, was recorded in Oregon with Christopher Stevens and released in 2003. He graduated from Northwest Christian University with a degree in Communications after spending a semester studying at the Contemporary Music Center in Martha's Vineyard.

His 2008 album is titled Diego's Diary. He is also on the tobyMac's albums Welcome to Diverse City and Renovating Diverse City. He was signed to Gotee Records. In October 2009, he led a songwriting workshop in Thailand.

Wright also recently released some singles which were custom songs he wrote for his fans. He offers his fans the opportunity to purchase an original song in which he writes and records their story for them.

Other projects 
Wright is also the singer in Rootdown a rock band from Eugene, Oregon. Singer/songwriter and personal friend Mat Kearney co-wrote with Wright his parts as the narrator of the rock opera !Hero. His character was named Agent Hunter. He worked for I.C.O.N. as an undercover agent, but later joined Hero, played by Michael Tait. Wright has been featured on CDs by tobyMac, LA Symphony, Falling Up, and Shawn McDonald.

Discography
Albums
 The Paul Wright EP (2003) Gotee Records
 Fly Away (2003) Gotee Records
 Sunrise to Sunset (2005) Gotee Records
 Midnight Sonnet Digital EP (2006) Gotee Records
 The Best Songs You Never Heard Digital EP (2006) Gotee Records
 Wright or Wrong: These Songs are Paul's (2007) Gotee Records
 Kingdom Come (2007) independent
 Diego's Diary (2008) independent

Singles
"Your Love Never Changes"
"You're Beautiful"
"Sunrise to Sunset"
"Take This Life"
"Bring Me Back"
"Sorry"
"Sunset Cliffs (Take Me Over)"
"16"
"Tulips"
"Your Heart Is"

References

External links
 
 Interview on WickedInfo.com
 Paul Wright Channel

Rappers from Oregon
1979 births
American performers of Christian music
Living people
Musicians from Eugene, Oregon
Bushnell University alumni
Gotee Records artists
21st-century American rappers
Singer-songwriters from Oregon